Eois snellenaria is a moth in the  family Geometridae. It is found in Suriname, Puerto Rico and Jamaica.

References

Moths described in 1882
Eois
Moths of the Caribbean
Moths of South America